Maronite Catholic Archeparchy of Damascus is an archeparchy of the Maronite Church. In 2013 there were 20,300 members. It is currently governed by Archbishop Samir Nassar.

Territory and statistics
The archeparchy includes the city of Damascus, where is located the Maronite Cathedral. The territory is divided into eight parishes and has 20,300 Maronite Catholics.

History
There are a series of Maronite Catholic bishops since 1527, however the archeparchy was canonically erected in the Maronite Synod of Mount Lebanon in 1736.

Bishops and archbishops
 Antun (1523 - 1529)
 Gergis al-Ihdini (1529 - 1562)
 Gergis Sulayman al-Qubursi (1561 - 1577)
 Gergis al-Basluqiti (1577 - 1580)
 Yusuf Musa al-Rizzi (1595 - 1597) appointed patriarch of Antioch
 Sarkis II al-Rizzi (1608-1638)
 Yusuf Umaymah al-Karmsaddani (1644 - 1653)
 Yaqub al-Rami (1653 - 1658)
 Sarkis al-Jamri al-Ihidni (1658 - 1668)
 Michael al-Ghaziri (? - 1697)
 Simon Awad (Simone Evodius) (27 January 1716 - 16 March 1743 appointed patriarch of Antioch)
 Michael al-Sayigh (1746 - 1755)
 Arsenio Abdul-Ahad (mentioned in August 1774)
 Joseph Tyan (6 August 1786 consecrated - 1788 appointed Patriarchal Vicar)
 Germanos al-Khazen (Germano Gazeno) (1794 - 1806)
 Estephan I al-Khazen (2 April 1806 - 31 December 1830)
 Joseph Ragi El Khazen (6 April 1830 - 1845) appointed Patriarchal
 Estephan II al-Khazen (Gazeno) (2 April 1848 - 8 December 1868 deceased)
 Nomatalla Dahdah (11 February 1872 - ? deceased)
 Paul Massad (12 June 1892 - March 1919 deceased)
 Bisciarah Riccardo Chemali (9 May 1920 - 24 December 1927 deceased)
 Jean El-Hage (29 April 1928 - 30 November 1955 deceased)
 Abdallah Najm 
 Michael Doumit (1960 - ?)
 Antoine Hamid Mourany (5 June 1989 - 10 March 1999 resigned)
 Raymond Eid (5 June 1999 - 25 September 2006 withdrawn)
 Samir Nassar, (since 14 October 2006)

See also

Maronite Catholic Eparchy of Latakia
Maronite Catholic Archeparchy of Aleppo

References

Sources
 Annuario Pontificio, Libreria Editrice Vaticana, Città del Vaticano, 2003, .

External links
 catholic-hierarchy.org

Maronite Catholic eparchies
Religion in Damascus